Ante Graovac is a Croatian scientist (born July 15, 1945 in Split, died November 13, 2012 in Zagreb) known for his contribution to chemical graph theory. He was director of 26 successful annual meetings MATH/CHEM/COMP held in Dubrovnik. He was Secretary of the International Academy of Mathematical Chemistry.

Selected publications
.

References 

Croatian scientists
Croatian chemists
1945 births
2012 deaths
Mathematical chemistry